The 17th annual Ale Kino! International Young Audience Film Festival was held from 26 April to 1 May 1999. A number of 43 movies took part.

The movies were presented in four cinemas in Poznań: Apollo, Olimpia, Muza and Gwiazda.

The movies were judged by professional and children jury, as well as by International Centre of Films for Children and Young People (CIFEJ).

References

External links
 17th Ale Kino! Official Homepage
 17th Ale Kino! at the Internet Movie Database

Ale Kino! Festival
Ale Kino! Festival
Ale Kino! Festival, 17
Ale Kino! Festival